Zhizn vo Slavu is the first live CD / DVD by the Russian folk metal band Arkona. It was released on 1/16 March 2006 through Sound Age Production.

Track listing

The last 3 tracks are a re-release of the 2002 demo Rus. The DVD version only includes tracks 2 through 11.

Credits
 Masha "Scream" – vocals
 Sergei "Lazar" – guitars
 Ruslan "Kniaz" – bass
 Vlad "Artist" – drums

References 

Arkona (band) albums
2006 live albums
2006 video albums
Live video albums